is a Japanese light novel series by Gakuto Mikumo with illustrations by Manyako, with 22 main volumes published between May 2011 and August 2020. A manga adaptation began serialization in June 2012 in ASCII Media Works's Dengeki Daioh. A 24-episode anime television adaptation by Silver Link and Connect aired between October 2013 and March 2014. An original video animation series titled Strike the Blood II was released in four volumes between November 2016 and May 2017. A third series titled Strike the Blood III was released from December 2018 to September 2019. A fourth series titled Strike the Blood IV was released from April 2020 to June 2021. A fifth and final season titled Strike the Blood Final was released between March 2022 and July 2022.

Plot

On Itogami Island, a man-made island south of Japan which has developed into a monster and demon sanctuary, Kojo Akatsuki is suspected of being the Fourth Progenitor, a powerful vampire who could potentially disrupt the balance of power among the world's three ruling progenitors.

Kojo was an ordinary high schooler before becoming a vampire and is reluctant to use the powers which he barely controls. Yukina Himeragi is a neophyte Sword Shaman whose first mission is to 'observe' him.

Before long, Kojo is the centre of attention of many who are concerned about the risks he represents. Kojo and Yukina befriend various students and others, some of whom are attracted to Kojo, and whose situations drive his libido, which provides the source of much of his power.

Media

Light novel
Strike the Blood began as a light novel series written by Gakuto Mikumo and illustrated by Manyako. ASCII Media Works has published 22 main volumes and two side story volumes from May 10, 2011, to August 7, 2020 under their Dengeki Bunko imprint. Yen Press published the English language edition from September 22, 2015, to November 22, 2022.

Side-stories

Manga
The manga was serialized from June 2012 to December 2016 in ASCII Media Works' Dengeki Daioh magazine.

The first tankōbon volume was released on December 15, 2012 and the concluding tenth volume on March 27, 2017. The English language edition, published by Yen Press, was released between October 15, 2015 and April 17, 2018.

Anime

A 24-episode anime adaptation produced by Silver Link and Connect began airing on October 4, 2013 on AT-X. The series is directed by Hideyo Yamamoto with scripts by Hiroyuki Yoshino and character design by Keiichi Sano. The second opening theme is "Fight 4 Real" by Altima and the second ending theme is "Signal" by Kanon Wakeshima. Crunchyroll (with distribution by Discotek Media) released the anime series in a combined Blu-ray/DVD format on November 8, 2016.

On March 15, 2015, publisher Dengeki Bunko announced that a two-part OVA based on an original story by creator Gakuto Mikumo would be released by year's end. On August 14, 2015, further details were announced for Strike the Blood: Kingdom of the Valkyria which would be released on DVD/BD on November 25 and December 23 of that year.

A second 4 volume, 8-episode OVA series based on the 9th light novel, co-produced by Silver Link and Connect and with returning director Hideyo Yamamoto, was released between November 21, 2016 and May 24, 2017.

A third 10-episode OVA series, produced by Connect and with returning director Hideyo Yamamoto, debuted on December 19, 2018, and concluded on September 29, 2019. The opening theme song is "Blood and Emotions" by Kishida Kyōdan & The Akeboshi Rockets and the ending theme song is "Love Stoic" by Taneda.

Another OVA titled Strike the Blood: Kieta Seisō-hen (The Lost Holy Spear) was released on January 29, 2020. A fourth OVA series, projected at 12 episodes, debuted on April 8, 2020, and concluded on June 30, 2021. Kishida Kyōdan & The Akeboshi Rockets perform the opening theme song, while Taneda performs the ending theme song. The staff from the third OVA series returned to reprise their roles. On May 15, 2020, it was announced that volume 2 was pushed back from June 24 to July 29 due to the COVID-19 pandemic.

After the conclusion of Strike the Blood IV, a fifth and final 4-episode OVA series titled Strike the Blood Final has been announced. It was released in 2 2-episode Blu-ray and DVD volumes; the first on March 30, 2022 and the second on July 29, 2022, after being delayed one month from June 29. The ending theme song is "Engagement ~Yakusoku~" by Risa Taneda.

Reception
All the three volumes of the anime series' release on DVD charted among the weekly best-selling Japan's animation DVD ranking, with each compilation selling over 1,000 copies. The Blu-ray discs were also among the best-selling of a week, and have sold over 4,000 copies per volume.

Season three's second volume was reported to have sold over 7000 BRD copies in its first week of release.

Reviews 
Theron Martin of the Anime News Network gave the show a B rating, praising its “Entertaining action, highly appealing female character designs, chemistry between Kojo and Yukina.” and highlighted the originality to, “...Make the male harem lead a fledgling vampire (albeit a very powerful one) who is still figuring out the ways of being a vampire.” but criticized it in that, “Most character and story elements are retreads, artistic quality control issues late in the series, how Kojo became a vampire is not sufficiently detailed.”

In describing the character designs, he wrote:
While nothing about the characters or the story arcs stands out, the series does deliver quite well on the action front and does excel in one important aspect: it has an exceptionally appealing array of female character designs to surround Kojo with. Keiichi Sano, whose other prominent character design effort was Heaven's Memo Pad, strikes gold here with designs that range from merely pretty to absolutely gorgeous.

And in summary, offered the following:
Despite its lack of freshness, Strike the Blood executes well enough, and establishes a convincing enough relationship between Kojo and Yukina, that it still proves plenty entertaining. It may be built on a tried-and-true formula which has developed over the past few years, but it does not mess it up by striving for anything too grand, by deigning to inflict preachy ramblings on its audience (see Index), or by generally failing to make sense (see Asura Cryin’).

China ban
On June 12, 2015, the Chinese Ministry of Culture listed Strike the Blood among 38 anime and manga titles banned in the People's Republic of China by the Central People's Government (State Council).

Notes

References

External links
 Official website 
 Strike the Blood  at ASCII Media Works 
 

2011 Japanese novels
2012 manga
2013 anime television series debuts
Action anime and manga
Anime and manga based on light novels
ASCII Media Works manga
Connect (studio)
Censored television series
Dengeki Bunko
Dengeki Daioh
Discotek Media
Kadokawa Dwango franchises
Light novels
Silver Link
Science fantasy anime and manga
Shōnen manga
Television censorship in China
Vampire novels
Vampires in anime and manga
Works banned in China
AT-X (TV network) original programming
Yen Press titles